Gołąbek or Golabek may refer to:

Gołąbek, Kuyavian-Pomeranian Voivodeship, Poland
Gołąbek, Masovian Voivodeship, Poland

See also

Gołąbki
Golabek (surname)